William Henry Steele Demarest (May 12, 1863 – June 23, 1956) was an American Dutch Reformed minister and the eleventh President of Rutgers College (now Rutgers University) serving from 1906 to 1924.

Biography

May 12, 1863 in Hudson, New York.

Having been educated at the Rutgers Grammar School (now the Rutgers Preparatory School), Demarest graduated with high honors from Rutgers College with a baccalaureate degree in 1883.  
From 1883 to 1886, Demarest taught at the Rutgers Preparatory School. In 1888 he graduated from the New Brunswick Theological Seminary, and that same year was ordained to the ministry of the Dutch Reformed Church, where he served until 1901 at which time he returned to the Seminary, and was appointed Professor of Ecclesiastical History and Church Government to replace retiring professor Samuel Merrill Woodbridge (1819–1905).  In 1905, Demarest was named as acting President of the College, and was elected by the Trustees to succeed Austin Scott as President in early 1906.   During his tenure, the New Jersey College for Women (now Douglass College) was established in 1918, through private donors and increased appropriation from the State of New Jersey, new facilities were constructed for instruction in Engineering, Chemistry, Entomology, and Ceramics and dormitories were built to accommodate the increased enrollment.  Following his resignation as President in 1924, Demarest served for ten years as president of the New Brunswick Theological Seminary and remained active in the affairs of the University. In 1924, he published History of Rutgers College.

He died on June 23, 1956 in New Brunswick, New Jersey.

Legacy
 Demarest Hall at Rutgers University is named in his honor.
 Demarest House was his home from 1906 until 1956.

References

External links
 Rutgers biography
 

1863 births
1956 deaths
Rutgers Preparatory School alumni
Rutgers University alumni
New Brunswick Theological Seminary alumni
Presidents of Rutgers University
Burials at Elmwood Cemetery (North Brunswick, New Jersey)